Renwadi is a village in Parner taluka in Ahmednagar district of state of Maharashtra, India. According to Census 2011 information the location code or village code of Renwadi village is 558343. Renwadi is situated 36km away from sub-district headquarter Parner and 41km away from district headquarter Ahmadnagar. As per 2009 stats, Renawadi is the gram panchayat of Renwadi village.

The total geographical area of village is 343.58 hectares. Renwadi has a total population of 1,344 peoples. There are about 248 houses in Renwadi village. As per 2019 stats, Renwadi villages comes under Parner assembly & Ahmednagar parliamentary constituency. Ahmadnagar is nearest town to Renwadi which is approximately 41km away. Digital Village Parner-India

Religion
The majority of the population in the village is Hindu.

Economy
The majority of the population has farming as their primary occupation.

See also
 Parner taluka
 Villages in Parner taluka- Renwadi

References 

Villages in Parner taluka
Villages in Ahmednagar district